Taylor Ellis Allen (born 16 June 2000) is an English footballer who plays as an attacking midfielder for EFL League Two club Walsall.

Career
Allen began his career at Midland Football League side Romulus while completing an apprenticeship as a sports coach. Allen joined Nuneaton Borough in January 2019, winning man of the match on his National League North debut, before having a trial with Leicester City in March, where he played for the under-23 team in Premier League 2. Allen turned down offers from English Premier League clubs to sign for Forest Green Rovers in summer 2019 on a one-year deal. He made his EFL League Two debut as a substitute against Oldham Athletic on 3 August 2019, scoring the only goal of the game in the 72nd minute.

Taylor joined National League North side Hereford on 25 October 2019 on a one month loan, with the loan being extended on 27 November 2019 for a further month.

Taylor then joined Gloucester City on loan for an initial month. 

On 2 December 2020, Allen joined Leamington on an initial one-month loan deal. The loan was then extended for a further month. On 9 February 2021, the loan was further extended for an additional month.

On 20 June 2022, Allen agreed to join League Two club Walsall on a one-year contract from 1 July when his Forest Green contract were to expire.

Career statistics

Honours
Forest Green Rovers
EFL League Two: 2021–22

References

External links

2000 births
Living people
English footballers
Association football forwards
Romulus F.C. players
Nuneaton Borough F.C. players
Forest Green Rovers F.C. players
Hereford F.C. players
Gloucester City A.F.C. players
Leamington F.C. players
Walsall F.C. players
English Football League players
National League (English football) players